Müsüslü (also, Myusyush, Myusyusli, Myusyusly, and Myusyuslyu) is a village and municipality in the Ujar Rayon of Azerbaijan.  It has a population of 1,427.

References 

Populated places in Ujar District